Rossy is a Canadian chain of discount stores.

It may also refer to:

Rossy (musician), musician from Madagascar
Rossy Aguirre, Mexican actress
Rossy Barbour, Canadian politician
Rossy de Palma, Spanish actress
Rossy Pratiwi Dipoyanti, Indonesian table tennis player
Rossy Evelin Lima, Mexican poet
Rossy Mendoza, Mexican actress
Rossy Moreno, Mexican wrestler
Rossy Noprihanis, Indonesian footballer
Derric Rossy, American boxer
Jorge Rossy, Spanish musician
Mario Rossy, Spanish musician
Mercedes Rossy, Spanish musician
Rico Rossy, American baseball player
Thomas de Rossy, Scottish clergyman
Thomas de Rossy (bishop of the Isles), Scottish clergyman
Yves Rossy, Swiss jet pack pilot